"Hazy Eyes" is the fourth single from the debut Fightstar album Grand Unification.
Written by Charlie Simpson and Alex Westaway, "Hazy Eyes" was released a year after the first single "Paint Your Target".

Track listing
CD:
 "Hazy Eyes"
 "She Drove Me to Daytime Television" (Funeral for a Friend Cover)

CD Maxi:
 "Hazy Eyes"
 "Fight For Us"
 "Palahniuk's Laughter"
 "Hazy Eyes" (Video)

7" Vinyl:
 "Hazy Eyes"
 "Sleep Well Tonight" (Live Acoustic)

Chart performance

References

2006 singles
Fightstar songs
Songs written by Alex Westaway
Songs written by Charlie Simpson
2006 songs
Island Records singles